Chakalabbi is a village in Dharwad district of Karnataka, India.

Demographics
As of the 2011 Census of India there were 466 households in Chakalabbi and a total population of 2,272 consisting of 1,156 males and 1,116 females. There were 247 children ages 0-6.

References

Villages in Dharwad district